Steven Goaxab (born 16 October 1983 in Grootfontein) is a Namibian footballer who played for Orlando Pirates S.C. in the Namibia Premier League and Carara Kicks F.C. in the South African National First Division. Goaxab has also capped with the Namibia national football team.

References

1983 births
Living people
Namibian men's footballers
Namibia international footballers
Association football defenders
Orlando Pirates S.C. players
People from Grootfontein
21st-century Namibian people